Dion Wiyoko (born in Surabaya, May 3, 1984) is an Indonesian actor of Chinese descent who started his career as a model.

Biography
Dion Wiyoko started his career as a model in some magazines such as Aneka Yess, Femina, and many more. Continuing his acting in FTV and soap opera, his first movie is Kuntilanak Beranak, released on 2009, followed by his next movie, Serigala Terakhir where he played as Lukman on the same year. In 2011, he took part in Khalifah where he played with Marsha Timothy, Ben Joshua, and Indra Herlam.

Dion became a model in clip videos such as ”Galih dan Ratna”, performed by D'Cinnamons, music group, and Ya ya ya, performed by GIGI.

Wiyoko ended his bachelorhood and after that proposed marriage to his lover Fiona Anthony. His marriage was held at St. Francis Xavier Church, Denpasar, Bali.

Filmography

Movies 
 Kuntilanak Beranak (2009)
 Serigala Terakhir (2009)
 Khalifah (2011)
 Hi5teria (2012)
 Hattrick (2012)
 Cinta di Saku Celana (2012)
 Perahu Kertas (2012)
 Loe Gue End (2012)
 Jakarta Hati (2012)
 Cinta Mati (2013)
 Isyarat (2013)
 Haji Backpacker  (2014)
 Merry Riana (2014)
 Hijab (2015)
 Love and Faith (2015)
 Air dan Api (2015)
 Cek Toko Sebelah (2016)
 Last Barongsai (2017)
 Terbang (2018)
 Susi Susanti: Love All (2018)
 Imperfect (2019)
 Cek Toko Sebelah 2 (2022)

Soap operas 
 Cinta Bunga - MD Entertainment (2008)
 Cinta Maia - MD Entertainment (2008)
 Kasih dan Amara - MD Entertainment (2009)
 Go Go Girls - Transinema (2011)

FTV 
 Semua Sayang Soraya - DSX Studio (2008)
 Semua Tentang Lestari - DSX Studio (2008)
 Tapi Bukan Dia - DSX Studio (2008)
 Mengejar Cinta Dara - DSX Studio (2008)
 Cintaku kepentok Nenek - DSX Studio (2009)
 Cowo Super Setia - Frame Ritz (2009)
 Cintaku Tumbuh Di Kebun Teh - DSX Studio (2009)
 Joni Jengki - MNC Pictures (2012)
 Cooking Clas Coto Betawi - Starvision Plus (2012)
 Kalau Jodoh Jangan Galak - Starvision Plus (2013)
 Kutunggu Kau Di Bawah Pohon Duren - Starvision Plus (2013)

Clip videos 
 ”Galih dan Ratna” - D'Cinnamons (2009)
 ”Gatal” - Ruben Onsu (2009)
 ”Ya.. Ya.. Ya..” - Gigi (2009)
 ”Pelangi” - Ardina Rasti (2009)

Awards and nominations

References

External links
 
 Site

1984 births
Living people
Indonesian male actors
Indonesian people of Chinese descent
People from Surabaya
Indonesian Roman Catholics